The term Four Valleys or Quatre-Vallées may refer to:

 The Four Valleys, a book by Bahá'u'lláh, the founder of the Bahá'í Faith
 Quatre-Vallées, a small province of France located in the southwest of France
 Quatre-Vallées, a ski area in Switzerland